Herman Goffberg (25 June 1921 – 17 August 2001) was an American long-distance runner who competed in the 1948 Summer Olympics.

See also
List of Pennsylvania State University Olympians

References

1921 births
2001 deaths
American male long-distance runners
Olympic track and field athletes of the United States
Athletes (track and field) at the 1948 Summer Olympics
20th-century American people